XHNZI-FM is a radio station on 99.1 FM in Nacozari, Sonora, Mexico.

History
The concession for XHNZI was awarded on October 28, 1994, to Javier Moreno Valle, a Mexico City businessman who would found XHTVM-TV in Mexico City and a Ciudad Juárez radio station.

The station's concession passed to Claudia Elena Lizárraga Verdugo in 2008. Grupo Radio Guaymas transferred operation of the station to Grupo Larsa Comunicaciones, a dominant radio broadcaster in Sonora, in 2017; Larsa immediately dropped the La Reyna del Cobre name and format for its own Toño adult hits format.

References

Radio stations in Sonora